Zwartówko is a dismantled former PKP railway station on the disused PKP rail line 230 in Zwartówko (Pomeranian Voivodeship), Poland.

Lines crossing the station

References 
Zwartówko article at Polish Stations Database, URL accessed at 19 March 2006

Disused railway stations in Pomeranian Voivodeship
Railway stations in Pomeranian Voivodeship
Wejherowo County